The South Pacific moray (Gymnothorax australicola) is a moray eel found in the southeast and southwest Pacific Ocean. It was first named by Lavenberg in 1992.

References

atolli
Fish described in 1992
Fish of the Pacific Ocean
Taxa named by Robert J. Lavenberg